Graham David Rose (born 12 April 1964), in Tottenham, England, was an English domestic cricketer for Somerset between 1987 and 2002. He was a right-handed batsman and right-arm medium pace bowler.

Rose played more than 250 first-class matches for Somerset, scoring over 8500 runs and just under 600 wickets. He twice took 7 wickets in an innings with his best bowling figures being 7/47 against Nottinghamshire in 1996. He also finished that game with best match figures of 13/88. He finished his first-class career in Somerset with 588 wickets which puts him 16th on their all-time list.

His benefit year in 1997 was arguably his best season for Somerset. He was voted All Rounder of the Year and scored 852 runs with 63 wickets. At Taunton he broke his county's 7th wicket partnership record with a 279 run stand with teammate Richard Harden.

He holds the world record for fastest ever List A Limited-Overs hundred.
In 1990 against Devon in Torquay he brought up the milestone off just 36 balls. His 50 had taken just 16 balls which is the equal 3rd fastest of all time.

References

External links
 

1964 births
Living people
English cricketers
Somerset cricketers
Middlesex cricketers